Melissa Del Valle (born June 2, 1969 in New York) is an American multiple champion in women's boxing.

A member of a sports-minded family of Puerto Rican immigrants, Del Valle took up boxing in the early 1990s, while her older brother Lou Del Valle was making a name for himself as a light-welterweight boxer.

Then fighting under her married name of Melissa Salamone, she won the New York state Golden Gloves title at 132 pounds in 1996 and 1997. In the latter year, she added the national amateur lightweight title, sweeping all five scorecards in the finals on July 19, 1997.

She then announced she was joining the professional ranks, debuting on September 5, 1997 with a first-round knockout of Marsha Evans. She followed that up with several more impressive victories, and one year and one week later, she earned her first title shot. On September 12, 1998, Del Valle won a 10-round unanimous decision over Melinda Robinson to claim the vacant WIBF super featherweight title.

She fought and won six non-title bouts over the next 11 months, then defended her title against fellow unbeaten Lena Akesson on August 14, 1999 in Miami Beach, Florida. Despite suffering a cut over one eye and an early knockdown, She rallied late to win a close but unanimous decision.

Personal problems then kept her out of the ring for nearly a year before she challenged Laura Serrano on August 5, 2000 in Connecticut for the IBA version of the super featherweight title. After 10 rounds, the fight was ruled a draw, but most spectators believed Serrano had won. Del Valle, in an act of candor that won her a great deal of respect, also admitted she thought Serrano beat her.

The controversial Serrano fight did not slow down Del Valle, however, and she won seven straight fights to earn yet another title shot, on June 21, 2002 against Ada Vélez for the WIBA super bantamweight title. This was the featured event on an all-women's card featuring several of the sport's top boxers. Del Valle rose to the occasion, taking Velez' title by winning seven of the 10 rounds on two cards and nine of 10 on the other.

Over a three-month period in 2003, Del Valle challenged four of the top fighters in women's boxing, suffering her first three losses in the process. On July 10, she fell to 27-1-1 by losing a close decision over six rounds to Kelsey Jeffries. On August 9, she faced junior lightweight world champion Isra Girgrah, taking the fight on short notice. Girgrah was given the decision, but most observers thought Del Valle won, and Girgrah promised her a rematch in the future.

Three weeks later, Del Valle moved back down to the super featherweight ranks once again and challenged Chevelle Hallback for her IBA title in Savannah, Georgia. Hallback defeated her over 10 rounds, handing Del Valle her third straight loss. But she got back on the winning track on October 11, when she handed undefeated Kelli Cofer her first loss in a six-round fight in Greensboro, North Carolina. The win over Cofer improved her career record to 28 wins, three losses and one draw, with 11 knockouts.

Del Valle is also noteworthy as the answer to a handful of boxing trivia questions. She and her brother are the only brother and sister to both win world boxing titles; Lou Del Valle was WBA light-heavyweight champion from 1997–98. She was also the first women's boxer to fight on the same card as her (then) husband, Craig Salamone. The two appeared together on a card in Atlanta, Georgia on November 21, 1997.

She is known by the nickname Honey Girl, in deference to her brother, who calls himself Honey Boy because of a reputation for being able to slip punches from opponents.

Professional boxing record

References

External links
 

1969 births
Living people
American women boxers
American people of Puerto Rican descent
Boxers from New York City
Light-welterweight boxers